Tartarus Press is an independent book publisher based near Leyburn, Yorkshire, UK.

Background
Tartarus Press is run by R. B. Russell and Rosalie Parker. It publishes classic and contemporary works of supernatural and strange fiction. Tartarus classic authors include Arthur Machen, Walter de la Mare, Oliver Onions, Edna W. Underwood, and more modern authors include Sarban, Robert Aickman and David Lindsay. Contemporary writers include Andrew Michael Hurley, Nike Sulway, Mark Valentine, Angela Slatter, Reggie Oliver and Joel Lane. A twice-yearly journal, Wormwood, was devoted to discussion of fantastic, supernatural and decadent literature, but has now ceased publication.

Tartarus won the World Fantasy Award "Special Award: Non-Professional" for their publishing in 2002, 2004, 2012, and 2015; and Strange Tales, their anthology of new short fiction, won the 2004 World Fantasy Award for Best Anthology of the year. The Horror Writers Association gave Tartarus Press the "Excellence in Speciality Press Publishing" award for 2009.

Notable books published by Tartarus Press include The Bitterwood Bible by Angela Slatter which won the World Fantasy Award for best Collection, and The Loney by Andrew Michael Hurley which won the Costa award, First Novel.

See also
Supernatural fiction
Book collecting

References

Further reading
Michael Dirda, "Ghost Stories", Washington Post, October 31, 2004, p. BW15.
Ben Stanley, Speculative Fiction Junkie Interview

External links
 Tartarus Press

British speculative fiction publishers
Small press publishing companies
Horror book publishing companies
Companies based in Richmondshire